Stevens may refer to:

People
 Stevens (surname), including a list of people with the surname

Given name
 Stevens Baker (1791–1868), farmer and member of the Legislative Assembly of Lower Canada
 Stevens T. Mason (1811–1843), territorial governor of the Michigan Territory, first governor of the state of Michigan
 Stevens Thomson Mason (Virginia) (1760–1803), a colonel in the American Continental Army and senator from Virginia, grandfather of the above

Places

United States
 Stevens, Pennsylvania, an unincorporated community
 Stevens, South Dakota, a ghost town
 Stevens County, Kansas
 Stevens County, Minnesota
 Stevens County, Washington
 Stevens Park (disambiguation), multiple locations
 Stevens Point, Wisconsin
 Stevens Township (disambiguation), multiple locations
 Stevens Village, Alaska, a census-designated place
 Lake Stevens, Washington, a lake and the surrounding city
 Stevens Creek, various creeks
 Stevens Pass, a pass through the Cascade Mountains in Washington
 Stevens Knoll, a hill that played a part in the Civil War Battle of Gettysburg

Other
 Stevens Rock, Antarctica
 38540 Stevens, an asteroid

Military

United States
 Fort Stevens (Oregon)
 Fort Stevens (Washington, D.C.)
 Battle of Fort Stevens (1864)
 USS Stevens (DD-86), U.S. Navy World War I destroyer
 USS Stevens (DD-479), U.S. Navy World War II destroyer

Schools
 Stevens School (disambiguation)
 Stevens High School (disambiguation)
 Stevens Institute of Technology, Hoboken, New Jersey

Businesses
 Stevens Arms, American firearms maker also known as the J Stevens Arms & Tool Co and the J Stevens Arms Co
 Stevens Motorcycles, a British company that made motorcycles from 1934 to 1938
 Stevens Vehicles, a British electric car and van manufacturer 
 Stevens, The Kitchen Specialists, a New Zealand kitchenware retailer owned by the James Pascoe Group

Automotive
 Stevens (constructor), a former racing car constructor
 Stevens-Duryea, early U.S. car

Other uses
 Stevens Inquiries, a British government report
 Stevens grip, a percussion technique for holding four mallets
 Stevens' power law, a psychophysical theory
 Stevens MRT station, a mass rapid transit station in Singapore
 Stevens Field, an airfield in Colorado
 SS Stevens, a floating dormitory
 Stevens Center, a performance venue in Winston-Salem

See also

 Steven (name)
 Stephens (name)
 Stephens (disambiguation)
 Justice Stevens (disambiguation)
 Stephen (disambiguation)
 Steve (disambiguation)